Carlos Enrique Mata Iturrzia (born August 28, 1952), better known as Carlos Mata, is a Venezuelan television actor and singer. Born in Caracas, Venezuela on August 28, 1952, he is best known for his great career in Venezuelan telenovelas for the companies Venezolana de Televisión, Radio Caracas Televisión and, Venevisión. Mata was the protagonist in 9 telenovelas, among them the most recognized are La dama de rosa (1986), Señora (1988), Las dos Dianas (1992), Déjate querer (1993) and Enamorada (1999), among others. His album "Que por que te quiero" remained for four months on the Billboard charts in 1985, where he shared the stage with artists such as: Miami Sound Machine, Lola Flores, Celia Cruz, Joaquin Sabina, Julio Iglesias, Brigitte Nielsen, Miguel Bosé, among many others.

Through his image, he was the biggest seller of Latin American telenovelas in the world, and was even mentioned by market studies as the third export product of Venezuela, and as the most recognized Spanish non-Spanish character.

Selected filmography

Awards and nominations

References

External links 
 

1952 births
Living people
Venezuelan male telenovela actors
20th-century Venezuelan male singers
21st-century Venezuelan male singers